N-Desmethyltamoxifen (developmental code name ICI-55,548) is a major metabolite of tamoxifen, a selective estrogen receptor modulator (SERM). N-Desmethyltamoxifen is further metabolized into endoxifen (4-hydroxy-N-desmethyltamoxifen), which is thought to be the major active form of tamoxifen in the body. In one study, N-desmethyltamoxifen had an affinity for the estrogen receptor of 2.4% relative to estradiol. For comparison, tamoxifen, endoxifen, and afimoxifene (4-hydroxytamoxifen) had relative binding affinities of 2.8%, 181%, and 181%, respectively.

References

Amines
Hormonal antineoplastic drugs
Human drug metabolites
Prodrugs
Selective estrogen receptor modulators
Triphenylethylenes